Temple Gate Polytechnic is a private Nigerian tertiary institution that was established in 2005 and accredited by the National Board for Technical Education in 2009. The polytechnic is located in Aba, Abia State and it offers National Diploma and Higher Diploma courses in undergraduate levels.

Faculties
The institution offers programmes under the following faculties;
 Faculty of Business and Management Technology
 Faculty of Engineering Technology
 Faculty of Environmental Design and Technology
 Faculty of Hospitality and Related Technology
 Faculty of Industrial and Applied Sciences Technology
 Faculty of Information Studies Technology

See also
 List of polytechnics in Nigeria

References

External links

Universities and colleges in Nigeria
2009 establishments in Nigeria
Educational institutions established in 2009
Education in Abia State